Bates School may refer to:

United States
Bates School (Bates, Arkansas), in the List of RHPs in AR
Bates College, a private college in Lewiston, Maine
Wiley H. Bates High School, Annapolis, MD, listed on the NRHP in Maryland
Joshua Bates School, Boston, MA